Charmois may refer to:
Charmois, Meurthe-et-Moselle, a commune of the Lorraine region of France
Charmois, Territoire de Belfort, a commune of the Franche-Comté region of France
Charmois-devant-Bruyères, a commune in the Vosges department in France
Charmois-l'Orgueilleux, a commune in the Vosges department in France

See also
Charmoy (disambiguation)